The Cagliari Observatory (or OAC) is an astronomical observatory owned and operated by Italy's Istituto Nazionale di Astrofisica (National Institute for Astrophysics, INAF). It is located 20 km away from Cagliari in Sardinia. It was founded in 1899 to study the Earth's rotation.

See also
 List of astronomical observatories

References

External links
Observatory home page
Outreach home page

Cagliari
1899 establishments in Italy